The 466th Fighter Squadron is the 419th Fighter Wing's operational flying squadron. It is located at Hill Air Force Base, Utah.

The squadron was activated late in World War II.  Intended as a long-range escort unit, it deployed to the Pacific, but remained in Hawaii until it was inactivated after VJ Day.  The squadron was reactivated in 1952 as the 466th Fighter-Escort Squadron, but was inactivated in 1956, when the concept of fighters escorting formations of bombers no longer jibed with United States military thinking.

Overview
The 419th uses 15 F-16C/D model aircraft, which are light, air-to-air daytime fighters. The 466th Fighter Squadron first saw action in 1998, participating in Exercise Cope Tiger. This is a drill which puts reserve pilots shoulder to shoulder with members of the Thailand and Singapore Air Forces. Later that year, the 466th was deployed to Kuwait in time for Operation Southern Watch. The 466th was part of a unit attempting to hold off Iraqi movements toward Kuwaiti and Saudi Arabia.

History

World War II
Formed in late 1944 under Second Air Force as one of the last Republic P-47 Thunderbolt fighter squadrons, programmed for deployment to Western Pacific theater with long-range P-47N for Boeing B-29 Superfortress escort missions.    Arrived in Hawaii in early 1945, assigned to Seventh Air Force.  Lack of a serious fighter defense over Japan at high altitudes and reprogramming of B-29 raids over Japan to night low-level fast attacks led to reassignment as an air defense and training unit in Hawaii.

Early Cold War fighter escort
Reactivated as the 466th Fighter-Escort Squadron to accompany formations of Strategic Air Command Boeing B-50 Superfortress and Convair B-36 Peacemaker bombers.  Twice deployed to Japan to augment air defense forces there. Inactivated in 1956 with the phaseout of the escort mission and retirement of the B-36.

Reserve fighter operations
Activated again in the reserve as the 466th Tactical Fighter Squadron in 1972 as a Republic F-105 Thunderchief squadron, being equipped with aircraft returned from inactivated Vietnam War squadrons.   Since 1984 has trained to fly interdiction, close air support, and counter-air missions. Deployed periodically for contingency operations, or for training exercises with other units.

Lineage
 Constituted as the 466th Fighter Squadron on 5 October 1944
 Activated on 12 October 1944
 Inactivated on 25 November 1945
 Redesignated 466th Fighter-Escort Squadron on 19 June 1952
 Activated on 1 July 1952
 Redesignated 466th Strategic Fighter Squadron on 20 January 1953
 Inactivated on 11 May 1956
 Redesignated 466th Tactical Fighter Squadron on 23 June 1972
 Activated in the reserve on 1 January 1973
 Redesignated 466th Fighter Squadron on 1 February 1992

Assignments
 508th Fighter Group, 12 October 1944 – 25 November 1945
 508th Fighter-Escort Wing (later 508th Strategic Fighter Wing), 1 July 1952 – 11 May 1956 (not operational until September 1952)
 508th Tactical Fighter Group, 1 January 1973
 301st Tactical Fighter Wing, 25 March 1973
 508th Tactical Fighter Group, 17 October 1975
 419th Tactical Fighter Wing (later 419th Fighter Wing), 1 October 1982
 419th Operations Group, 1 August 1992 – present

Stations

 Peterson Field, Colorado, 12 October 1944
 Pocatello Army Air Field, Idaho, 25 October 1944
 Bruning Army Air Field, Nebraska, 15 November – 18 December 1944
 Kahuku Army Air Base, Hawaii, 6 January 1945
 Mokuleia Army Air Base, Hawaii, 25 February 1945
 Bellows Field, Hawaii, 16 September – 25 November 1945

 Turner Air Force Base, Georgia, 1 July 1952 – 11 May 1956 (deployed to Misawa Air Base, Japan, 8 February – 5 May 1953 and 16 February – 16 May 1954)
 Hill Air Force Base, Utah, 1 January 1973 – present

Aircraft
 Republic P-47 Thunderbolt, 1944–1945
 Republic F-84 Thunderjet, 1952–1956
 Republic F-105 Thunderchief, 1973–1984
 Lockheed T-33 T-Bird, 1973–1980
 General Dynamics F-16 Fighting Falcon 1984–2017
 Lockheed Martin F-35A Lightning II 2017 – present

References

 Notes

 Citations

Bibliography

External links
 419 Fighter Wing factsheet
466th Fighter Squadron info at global security.org

Military units and formations established in 1944
466
Military units and formations in Utah
Fighter squadrons of the United States Army Air Forces